Bevis Kristofer Kizito Mugabi (born 1 May 1995) is a professional footballer who plays as a defender for Scottish Premiership club Motherwell. He has previously played in the English Football League for Yeovil Town. Born in England, he represents Uganda at international level.

Early and personal life
Mugabi was born in Harrow, London, to parents from Kampala, Uganda.

Club career

Early career
Mugabi started his career with Fulham before joining Southampton's youth system in July 2011, and signed a new two-and-a-half-year contract with the club in February 2015.

Yeovil Town
He signed for League Two club Yeovil Town on 5 August 2016 on a one-year contract. He made his first-team debut on 9 August 2016, as a 54th-minute substitute in an EFL Cup match against Walsall. Mugabi scored his first goal for Yeovil in an EFL Trophy tie against Portsmouth on 30 August 2016. He signed a new two-year contract with the club in May 2017.

At the end of the 2018–19 season, Mugabi was released by Yeovil following the club's relegation from League Two.

Motherwell
On 12 September 2019, Mugabi signed for Motherwell on a contract until January 2020. After Motherwell teammate Charles Dunne was injured, Mugabi was set to make his debut sooner than expected. On 22 November 2019, Motherwell announced that they had extended their contract with Mugabi until the summer of 2021.

On 18 February 2022, Mugabi signed a new contract with Motherwell, until the summer of 2024.

International career
Mugabi was eligible to represent England or Uganda at international level.

In August 2016, Mugabi received his first call up to the Uganda national team for their friendly against Kenya and their 2017 Africa Cup of Nations qualification match against Comoros, but Mugabi was withdrawn from the squad by Yeovil Town with the club citing the short notice of the call-up as the reason for his withdrawal. In March 2018, Mugabi received a second call up to the Uganda national team for two international friendlies. Mugabi made his international debut for Uganda on 24 March 2018 in their 3–1 friendly victory over São Tomé and Príncipe. Mugabi returned to the national team after a year long absence when he was included in Uganda's squad for the 2019 Africa Cup of Nations.

Career statistics

Club

International

Honours
Southampton
U21 Premier League Cup: 2014–15

References

External links

1995 births
Living people
Footballers from Harrow, London
English footballers
Ugandan footballers
Uganda international footballers
Association football defenders
Fulham F.C. players
Southampton F.C. players
Yeovil Town F.C. players
Motherwell F.C. players
English Football League players
Scottish Professional Football League players
2019 Africa Cup of Nations players
English people of Ugandan descent